The Benz Bz.IIIb was an eight-cylinder, water-cooled, V-engine developed in Germany for use in aircraft in 1918.

Design and development
Inspired by the Hispano-Suiza 8, some of which were captured and tested, the Benz Bz.IIIb was a fairly large engine, but its performance was disappointing.  Despite not being accepted for service use a number of late World War I prototype German aircraft used the Bz.IIIb, the Benz IIIbo and the geared Benz IIIbm.  The latter suffered vibration problems.

Applications
 AEG DJ.I
 AEG PE
 Albatros D.X
 Albatros Dr.II
 Albatros W.8
 LFG Roland D.VII
 LFG Roland D.VIII

Specifications (Benz Bz.IIIb)

See also

Notes

References
 

1910s aircraft piston engines